African elephants are genus of elephant, Loxodonta. It contains two extant species, the African bush elephant, L. africana, and the African forest elephant, L. cyclotis. 

African Elephant may also refer to:

Sculpture
A 1982 steel sculpture by Robert Fowler, 'African Elephant' (sculpture)

Music 
African Elephants (album), a 2009 album by Dead to Me

See also
 Elephant (disambiguation)